Oriakhi is a surname. Notable people with the surname include:

 Alex Oriakhi (born 1990), American basketball player
 Davina Oriakhi (born 1994), Nigerian singer and songwriter